Jonathan Richards (born 1954) is a British competitive sailor and Olympic medalist. He won a bronze medal in the Flying Dutchman class at the 1984 Summer Olympics in Los Angeles, together with Peter Allam.

References

1954 births
Living people
British male sailors (sport)
Sailors at the 1984 Summer Olympics – Flying Dutchman
Olympic sailors of Great Britain
Olympic bronze medallists for Great Britain
Olympic medalists in sailing
Medalists at the 1984 Summer Olympics